Binoy Dutta (11 April 1945 – 22 February 2020) was an Indian politician from West Bengal belonging to Communist Party of India (Marxist). He was elected thrice as a member of the West Bengal Legislative Assembly.

Biography
Dutta was elected as a member of the  West Bengal Legislative Assembly from Arambag in 1996. He was also elected from that constituency in 2001 and 2006.

Dutta died on 22 February 2020 at the age of 75.

References

Communist Party of India (Marxist) politicians from West Bengal
West Bengal MLAs 1996–2001
West Bengal MLAs 2001–2006
West Bengal MLAs 2006–2011
1940s births
2020 deaths
People from Hooghly district